"Tunak Tunak Tun" or simply "Tunak", is a Bhangra/Indi-pop song by Indian Punjabi artist Daler Mehndi, released in 1998. It was the first Indian music video made using chroma key technology.

The song and the video were a success in India, cementing Mehndi's status as India's biggest and most popular popstar at the time. It later gained international success and garnered a cult following, especially after it became an internet meme in the 2000s.

Background

Mehndi claims his music was often criticized for only being popular due to the abundance of beautiful, dancing women in his videos. The singer responded by creating a video that featured nobody but himself. The music video was the first made in India using Bluescreen technology, which allowed the singer to superimpose his image over various computer-generated backgrounds including desert and mountain landscapes as well as St. Basil's Cathedral.

Music video
The music video follows a simple plot about four men, all played by Mehndi, who represent the four classical elements and dress in lavish Indian clothing. The earth Mehndi wears red/maroon, the fire Mehndi wears orange, the wind Mehndi wears brown, and the water Mehndi wears green. The men start off as comets made of water, earth, air, and fire before transforming into clothed Mehndis. Each of the Mehndis take turns singing, dancing and pointing at each other as though they are discussing something. The Mehndis later fuse by first reverting to their comet states and then merging to form one big Mehndi, who is predominantly clad in garb of gold and emerald.

The "Tunak Tunak Tun" lyrics are a reference to the sounds made by a tumbi (also called tumba), a traditional musical instrument from the Punjab region in the northern Indian subcontinent. The lyrics also refer to the ektara or tuntuna.

As of 1 October 2022, the music video has received over  views on the Sony Music India channel at YouTube.

Reception
The song and the music video received a negative review from Rashtriya Sahara magazine in 1998. Despite this, the song became an incredible commercial success in 1998, becoming the biggest Indi-pop hit at the time.

International popular culture
By 1999, the song found an international cult following, particularly among the South Asian diaspora in countries such as the United Kingdom and United States, as well as in Far-Eastern markets such as Japan. In China, it attained popularity for its lyrics, which sound like nonsensical words, gaining the song the Chinese name, "我在東北玩泥巴" ("I'm playing clay in Northeastern China").

In the 2000s, "Tunak Tunak Tun" found greater international popularity on the internet as a viral video. In response, the video game company Blizzard Entertainment incorporated the "Tunak Tunak Tun" dance as a character animation in their multiplayer role-playing game World of Warcraft: The Burning Crusade in 2007. This dance is also included as an easter egg in the video game Medal of Honor: Allied Assault Spearhead.

Chart performance

References

Indian songs
Viral videos
Punjabi-language songs
1998 songs
Magnasound Records albums
Internet memes introduced in 2006